"Check Yes or No" is a song written by Danny Wells and Dana Hunt Black, and recorded by American country music singer George Strait.  It was released in September 1995 as the lead single from his box set Strait Out of the Box.  It peaked at number-one on both the U.S. Billboard country chart and the Canadian RPM country chart.
It was also included as a bonus track on the UK released version of the "Blue Clear Sky" album in 1996.

Critical reception
Deborah Evans Price, of Billboard magazine reviewed the song favorably saying that the song "is another winner from country music's most consistent hit maker." She also states that Strait delivers it with "warmth and charm, as well as with an upbeat melody tailor-made for country radio."

Music video
The music video for the song featured actor/singer/songwriter Michael Ray Ryan as the main character and Dawn Waggoner (the real-life founder of the Texas Bikini Team) as the main character's leading lady.

Chart positions
"Check Yes or No" debuted at number 63 on the U.S. Billboard Hot Country Singles & Tracks for the week of September 23, 1995.

Year-end charts

Certifications

References

1995 singles
1995 songs
George Strait songs
Song recordings produced by Tony Brown (record producer)
Music videos directed by John Lloyd Miller
Songs written by Danny Wells (songwriter)
MCA Records singles